Richard P. Guidry, known as Dick Guidry was an American politician and businessman, who served as a member of the Louisiana House of Representatives.

References

1929 births
2014 deaths
Democratic Party members of the Louisiana House of Representatives
People from Galliano, Louisiana
Businesspeople from Louisiana
Cajun people
Place of death missing
20th-century American businesspeople